Pringle is an unincorporated community in northern Hutchinson County, Texas, United States. The Pringle-Morse Consolidated Independent School District serves area students.

References

Unincorporated communities in Texas
Unincorporated communities in Hutchinson County, Texas
Ghost towns in the Texas Panhandle